Arash Hejazi, born 1971 in Tehran, Iran, is an Iranian physician, novelist, fiction writer and translator of literary works from English and Portuguese into Persian. He is also an editor in Caravan Books Publishing House (Iran), and Book Fiesta Literary Magazine. He is a member of the Tehran Union of Publishers and Booksellers (TUPB) and was the managing editor of its journal, Sanat-e-Nashr (Publishing Industry), from 2006 to 2007. He was one of the nominees to receive the Freedom to Publish Prize held by International Publishers’ Association (IPA) in 2006. He is also a novel writer, whose best known novel The Princess of the Land of Eternity was shortlisted for two major Iranian literary prizes and has sold more than 20,000 copies in Iran since its first publication in 2003. He in 2009 he received his MA in Publishing from Oxford Brookes University. His dissertation on censorship in Iran was published in the publishing journal Logos in 2011, and his memoir The Gaze of the Gazelle about growing up in Iran after the Islamic Revolution was published by Chicago University Press in 2011.

He was present at the death of Neda Agha-Soltan during the 2009 Iranian election protests, and was one of those who attempted to save her life. He lived in Tehran. Arash Hejazi is reported to have since fled Iran out of fear of government reprisals.

Education 
Arash Hejazi studied medicine and his thesis was "The influences of storytelling on children's anxiety disorders".

Works

Nonfiction 
The Gaze of the Gazelle: Story of a Generation (memoirs)

Fiction 
He has three novels and many short stories, including:
 The Grief of The Moon, novel, Tehran, 1994.
 The Princess of the Land of Eternity, novel, Caravan Books Publishing House, Tehran, 2004.
 Kaykhusro, novel, Caravan Books Publishing House, Tehran, 2009
 The Cave, Short story, Jashne Ketab Literary Magazine, 2003.
 The Dark Hate, Short Story, Book Fiesta Magazine, 2007.

Essays 
 You don't Deserve to be Published: Book Censorship in Iran, March 2011, LOGOS
 The influences of storytelling on children's anxiety disorders, Iran University of Medical Sciences.
 Important Factors on Determining the Print Run for Books, Publishing Industry, Tehran's Union of Publishers and Booksellers Magazine.
 Last Call for a New Blood: the disinterest of UK and US publishers towards books in translation and its implications, Oxford Brookes University, International Centre for Publishing Studies

Translator 
As a literary translator, he has translated many works, from Paulo Coelho, Milan Kundera, Kahlil Gibran Lord Dunsany, etc.

Witness of death of Neda Agha-Soltan 

Dr. Hejazi was present at a rally held in Tehran on June 20, 2009, to protest alleged electoral fraud in the Iranian presidential elections, at which Neda Agha-Soltan was shot and killed, allegedly by a member of the Basij militia.  He was among the first to respond when Neda was shot, but his attempts to save her life were unsuccessful.  A non-political figure, Dr. Hejazi has spoken out, describing the events that transpired at the rally and surrounding Neda's death.

See also 
 List of Iranian writers
 Death of Neda Agha-Soltan
 Persian Speculative Art and Literature Award

Notes

External links
 Arash Hejazi's Official Website
 Arash Hejazi's website and blog in English
 Caravan Books Publishing House
 The Website for The Gaze of the Gazelle: Arash Hejazi's Memoirs

Iranian translators
Iranian publishers (people)
Iranian male novelists
Iranian novelists
1971 births
Living people